That One Night is a 2008 Canadian comedy film directed, written and produced by Rick Alyea and starring Crystal Lowe, Amanda Crew and Sam Easton. The film was shown at the 2008 Omaha Film Festival.

Cast
 Benjamin Arthur as Chauncey
 Paul Anthony as Adam
 Crystal Lowe as Stacy
 Sam Easton as Bobby
 Amanda Crew as Marie 
 Nathan Clark as Justin
 Lucie Guest as Tina
 Amy Couldwell as Tracy
 Aubrey Tennant as Clarke
 Ben Cotten as Craig

External links
 

Canadian comedy films
English-language Canadian films
2000s Canadian films